Kąkolewo  is a village in the administrative district of Gmina Osieczna, within Leszno County, Greater Poland Voivodeship, in west-central Poland. It was formerly in Leszno Voivodeship (1975–1998).

The village has a population of 2,100.

References

Villages in Leszno County